Weihai, formerly called Weihaiwei, is a prefecture-level city and major seaport in easternmost Shandong province. It borders Yantai to the west and the Yellow Sea to the east, and is the closest Chinese city to South Korea (specifically, Chengshan to Yeonpyeongdo, 174km).

Weihai's population was 2,804,771 as of the 2020 Chinese census, of whom 1,164,730 lived in the current built-up (or metro) area of (Huancui District) even though Wendeng district to the south with 563,529 inhabitants is soon being conurbated. There are two county-level cities within Weihai; Rongcheng has a built up area with 714,211 inhabitants, while Rushan had 464,078 inhabitants in 2020. A subway is planned with 4 lines and  route length to link all city districts. The first phase, Line 1 and 2 is planned for 2025.

History 

Prehistorically, it was inhabited by Dongyi tribes, and it was annexed into China Proper by the state of Qi in 567 B.C.

Before the 14th century, Weihai was a minor fishing settlement. In 1398, during the Ming dynasty, it became a military stronghold (wei) to defend against raids by the wokou. The fortification at Weihai was constructed in 1403, and contained walls almost 2 miles (3.2 km) in circumference.

Weihaiwei was the base for the Beiyang Fleet during the Qing Dynasty. In 1895, the Japanese captured it in the Battle of Weihaiwei, which is regarded as the last major battle of the First Sino-Japanese War. The Japanese then evacuated Weihaiwei on 24 May 1898, after which it was occupied by the British.

The core of Weihai (now Huancui District) was ruled by the British from 1 July 1898 to 1930 under lease agreement with the Chinese empire, with Port Edward (the center of the original Weihai city, now in Huancui District) serving as the capital. A Royal Navy base was built on Liugong Island. 

Weihaiwei became a special administrative region after it was returned to the Republic of China on 1 October 1930, but Liugong Island and its facilities were leased back to the U.K. until 1940.

Weihaiwei was occupied by the Japanese from 1938 to 1945.  There was a withdrawal of most British forces and supplies from Liugong Island, and finally a Japanese military landing and occupation of the island in 1940.

The region was formally incorporated into Shandong province on 10 May 1945.  In 1949, Weihaiwei City was established, and its name was shortened to Weihai after the Communist revolution.

Since 2003, a replica of the Chinese battleship Dingyuan has been anchored here as a museum ship and memorial for Chinese veterans of the First Sino-Japanese War.

Administrative divisions 
The prefecture-level city of Weihai administers four county-level divisions, including two districts and two county-level cities.

These are further divided into 66 township-level divisions, including 52 towns and 14 subdistricts.

Geography and climate 

Weihai is located on the northeastern shore of Shandong; its administrative area includes , the easternmost tip of the Shandong Peninsula (Shantung Peninsula). The city is surrounded by sea on three sides; its port is protected by Liugong Island.

Weihai experiences a continental climate, and it is climactically influenced by the surrounding Yellow Sea and the Siberian high. Springtime warming and autumn cooling are delayed by one month, winds are generally high, and the average diurnal temperature variation throughout the year is small—at only . More than two-thirds of the annual precipitation occurs from June to September, and there are nearly 2,540 hours of sunshine per year.

Economy 

Weihai is a commercial port and major fishing center with some light industries. Due to its close proximity to South Korea, Weihai also has a large Korean business community and receives many Korean tourists. Weihai is also a key production area for peanuts and fruit.

Industrial Zone
Weihai Economic & Technological Development Zone is a state-level development zone approved by the State Council on 21 October 1992. Its nearest port is Weihai Port, and the airport closest to the zone is Dashuibo Airport.

Weihai Export Processing Zone (EPZ) was set up by the approval of the State Council on 27 April 2000. Weihai EPZ belongs to comprehensive export & processing zone.

Weihai Torch Hi-Tech Science Park is a state-level development zone approved by the State Council in March 1991.

Transportation 

Weihai Dashuibo Airport serves the city with regular service to Beijing, Shanghai, Guangzhou, Harbin domestically and the Korean cities of Seoul and Busan, as the fourth busiest airport in Shandong following Qingdao, Jinan and Yantai.

Qingdao–Rongcheng intercity railway offers the high-speed rail services directly to Shanghai Hongqiao, Beijing South, Jinan, Jimo North (Qingdao North soon) and Yantai, with five rail stations, Weihai, Weihai North, Wendeng, Wendeng East and Rongcheng.

As for conventional rail services, The K8262 train depart every day at and 10:18 PM respectively for Jinan, the provincial capital, the K412 goes directly to Beijing at 8:54 PM, and the No. K1068 train leaves at 9:38 AM for Hankou, one of the three railway stations of Wuhan, Hubei. Internally, the city is served by more than 50 bus routes.

Education 

Campuses of Shandong University, Harbin Institute of Technology, Beijing Jiaotong University, Harbin University of Science and Technology, as well as Shandong Jiaotong University are located in Weihai.

Secondary Schools
 Weihai No. 1 Middle School (威海一中)
 Weihai No. 2 High School (威海市第二中学)

Eponymy 
 The minor planet 207931 Weihai is named after this city.

See also 
 Weihaiwei under British rule
 List of twin towns and sister cities in China
 Liugong Island
 Revenue stamps of Weihaiwei

References

Citations

Sources

External links 

 

 
Cities in Shandong
Prefecture-level divisions of Shandong
Port cities and towns in China
National Forest Cities in China